Caravaggio is a large crater on Mercury. The crater was named after the Italian painter Caravaggio by the IAU in 2013.

Caravaggio is one of 110 peak ring basins on Mercury.

References

Impact craters on Mercury
Caravaggio